Ruben Christiaan de Villiers (born ) is a South African rugby union player who last played for  in the Rugby Challenge. His regular position is lock.

References

South African rugby union players
Living people
1997 births
Rugby union players from Pretoria
Rugby union locks
Western Province (rugby union) players
South Africa Under-20 international rugby union players